Contemporary Latin is the form of the Literary Latin used since the end of the 19th century. Various kinds of contemporary Latin can be distinguished, including the use of New Latin words in taxonomy and in science generally, and the fuller ecclesiastical use in the Catholic Church – but Living or Spoken Latin (the use of Latin as a language in its own right as a full-fledged means of expression) is the primary subject of this article.

Token Latin
Latin is still present in words or phrases used in many languages around the world, as a relic of the great importance of New Latin, which was the formerly dominant international lingua franca down to the 19th century in a great number of fields.  Some minor communities also use Latin in their speech.

Mottos
The official use of Latin in previous eras has survived at a symbolic level in many mottos that are still being used and even coined in Latin to this day. Similarly, current pound sterling coins are minted with the Latin inscription CHARLES III·D·G·REX·F·D (i.e. By the Grace of God, King, Defender of the Faith), although, unlike previous monarchs, King Charles III uses the English version of his name, not the Latin. The official motto of the multilingual European Union, adopted as recently as 2000, is the Latin . Similarly, in officially bilingual Canada the motto on the Canadian Victoria Cross is Pro Valore.

Fixed phrases

In science

In fields as varied as mathematics, physics, astronomy, medicine, pharmacy, biology, and philosophy, Latin still provides internationally accepted names of concepts, forces, objects, and organisms in the natural world.

The most prominent retention of Latin occurs in the classification of living organisms and the binomial nomenclature devised by Carl Linnaeus, although the rules of nomenclature used today allow the construction of names which may deviate considerably from historical norms.

Another continuation is the use of Latin names for the constellations and celestial objects (used in the Bayer designations of stars), as well as planets and satellites, whose surface features have been given Latin selenographic toponyms since the 17th century.

Vernacular vocabulary
Latin has also contributed a vocabulary for specialised fields such as anatomy and law which has become part of the normal, non-technical vocabulary of various European languages. Latin continues to be used to form international scientific vocabulary and classical compounds. Separately, more than 56% of the vocabulary used in English today derives ultimately from Latin, either directly (28.24%) or through French (28.30%).

Ecclesiastical Latin

The Catholic Church has continued to use Latin: Two main areas can be distinguished. One is its use for the official version of all documents issued by the Holy See, which has remained intact to the present. Although documents are first drafted in various vernaculars (mostly Italian), the official version is written in Latin by the Latin Letters Office. The other is its use for the liturgy, which has diminished after the Second Vatican Council of 1962–65, but to some degree resurged half a century later when Pope Benedict XVI encouraged the Latin Mass.

After the Church of England published the Book of Common Prayer in English in 1559, a 1560 Latin edition was published for use at universities such as Oxford and the leading public schools, where the liturgy was still permitted to be conducted in Latin, and there have been several Latin translations since. Most recently a Latin edition of the 1979 USA Anglican Book of Common Prayer has appeared.

Academic Latin
Latin has also survived to some extent in the context of classical scholarship. Some classical periodicals, like Mnemosyne  and the German Hermes, to this day accept articles in Latin for publication. Latin is used in most of the introductions to the critical editions of ancient authors in the Oxford Classical Texts series, and it is also nearly always used for the apparatus criticus of Ancient Greek and Latin texts.

The University Orator at the University of Cambridge makes a speech in Latin marking the achievements of each of the honorands at the annual Honorary Degree Congregations, as does the Public Orator at the Encaenia ceremony at the University of Oxford. Harvard and Princeton also have Latin Salutatory commencement addresses every year. The Charles University in Prague and many other universities around the world conduct the awarding of their doctoral degrees in Latin. Other universities and other schools issue diplomas written in Latin. Brown, Sewanee, and Bard College also hold a portion of their graduation ceremonies in Latin. The song  is sung at university opening or graduation ceremonies throughout Europe.

Living Latin
 Living Latin ( in Latin itself), also known as Spoken Latin, is an effort to revive Latin as a spoken language and as the vehicle for contemporary communication and publication. Involvement in this Latin revival can be a mere hobby or extend to more serious projects for restoring its former role as an international auxiliary language.

Origins
After the decline of Latin at the end of the New Latin era started to be perceived, there were attempts to counteract the decline and to revitalize the use of Latin for international communication.

In 1815, Miguel Olmo wrote a booklet proposing Latin as the common language for Europe, with the title  (" of Villaudric to the eight great princes who ordained world peace at Vienna in 1815, an extraordinary book about the Latin language and a Latin state to be founded").

In the late 19th century, Latin periodicals advocating the revived use of Latin as an international language started to appear. Between 1889 and 1895, Karl Heinrich Ulrichs published in Italy his .

The early 20th century, marked by tremendous technological progress, as well as drastic social changes, saw few advances in the use of Latin outside academia. Following the beginnings of the re-integration of postwar Europe, however, Latin revivalism gained some ground.

One of its main promoters was the former dean of the University of Nancy (France), Prof. Jean Capelle, who in 1952 published a cornerstone article called "Latin or Babel" in which he proposed Latin as an international spoken language.

Capelle was called "the soul of the movement" when in 1956 the first International Conference for Living Latin took place in Avignon, marking the beginning of a new era of the active use of Latin. About 200 participants from 22 different countries took part in that foundational conference.

Pronunciation
The essentials of the classical pronunciation had been defined since the early 19th century (e.g. in K.L. Schneider's , 1819) but, in many countries, there was strong resistance to adopting it in instruction. In English-speaking countries, where the traditional academic pronunciation diverged most markedly from the restored classical model, the struggle between the two pronunciations lasted the entire 19th century. In 1907, the "new pronunciation" was officially recommended by the Board of Education for adoption in schools in England.

Although the older pronunciation, as found in the nomenclature and terminology of various professions, continued to be used for several decades, and in some spheres prevails to the present day, contemporary Latin as used by the living Latin community has generally adopted the classical pronunciation of Latin as restored by specialists in Latin historical phonology.

Aims
Many users of Contemporary Latin promote its use as a spoken language, a movement that dubs itself "Living Latin." Two main aims can be distinguished in this movement:

For Latin instruction

Among the proponents of spoken Latin, some promote the active use of the language to make learning Latin both more enjoyable and more efficient, drawing upon the methodologies of instructors of modern languages.

In the United Kingdom, the Association for the Reform of Latin Teaching (ARLT, still in existence as the Association for Latin Teaching) was founded in 1913 by the classical scholar W. H. D. Rouse. It arose from summer schools which Rouse organised to train Latin teachers in the direct method of language teaching, which entailed using the language in everyday situations rather than merely learning grammar and syntax by rote. The Classical Association also encourages this approach. The Cambridge University Press has now published a series of school textbooks based on the adventures of a mouse called Minimus, designed to help children of primary school age to learn the language, as well as its well-known Cambridge Latin Course (CLC) to teach the language to secondary school students, all of which include extensive use of dialogue and an approach to language teaching mirroring that now used for most modern languages, which have brought many of the principles espoused by Rouse and the ARLT into the mainstream of Latin teaching.

Outside Great Britain, one of the most accomplished handbooks that fully adopts the direct method for Latin is the well-known  by the Danish linguist Hans Henning Ørberg. It was first published in 1955 and improved in 1990. It is composed fully in Latin and requires no other language of instruction, thus it can be used to teach students of many different languages.

For contemporary communication
Others support the revival of Latin as a language of international communication in academic, scientific, or diplomatic spheres (as it was in Europe and European colonies through the Middle Ages until the mid-18th century) or as an international auxiliary language to be used by anyone. However, as a language native to no people, this movement has not received support from any government, national or supranational.

Supporting institutions and publications
A substantial group of institutions (particularly in Europe, but also in North and South America) has emerged to support the use of Latin as a spoken language.

The foundational first International Conference for living Latin that took place in Avignon was followed by at least five others. Among its most prominent members are well-known classicists from all over the world, like Prof. Michael von Albrecht or Prof. . The ALF held its first international conference in Rome in 1966 bringing together about 500 participants. From then on conferences have taken place every four or five years, in Bucharest, Malta, Dakar, Erfurt, Berlin, Madrid, and many other places. The official language of the ALF is Latin and all acts and proceedings take place in Latin.

Also in the year 1966, Clément Desessard published a method with tapes within the series  of the French company Assimil. Desessard's work aimed at teaching contemporary Latin for use in an everyday context, although the audio was often criticized for being recorded with a thick French accent. Assimil took this out of print at the end of 2007 and published another Latin method which focused on the classical idiom only. However, in 2015 Assimil re-published Desessard's edition with new audio CDs in restored classical Latin pronunciation.

The first  (Amöneburg Latin Week) was organized in 1989 at Amöneburg, near Marburg in Germany, by Mechtild Hofmann and Robertus Maier. Since then the Latin Weeks were offered every year. In addition, members of the supporting association  (European Latin Weeks) published a text book named  that contains dialogues in modern everyday Latin.

At the  located in Rome, Italy, all classes are taught by faculty fluent in Latin or Ancient Greek, and resident students speak in Latin or Greek at all times outside class. Most students are supported by scholarships from the Mnemosyne foundation and spend one or two years in residence to acquire fluency in Latin. The living Latin movement eventually crossed the Atlantic, where it continues to grow. In the summer of 1996, at the University of Kentucky, Prof. Terence Tunberg established the first Conventiculum, an immersion conference in which participants from all over the world meet annually to exercise the active use of Latin to discuss books and literature, and topics related to everyday life. The success of the Conventiculum Lexintoniense has inspired similar conferences throughout the United States.

This is the only degree-conferring program in the world with courses taught entirely in Latin.

There is also a proliferation of Latin-speaking institutions, groups and conferences in the Iberian Peninsula and in Latin America. Some prominent examples of this tendency towards the active use of Latin within Spanish and Portuguese-speaking countries are the annual conferences called Jornadas de Culturaclasica.com, held in different cities of southern Spain, as well as the CAELVM, a Latin summer program in Madrid.

Most of these groups and institutions organise seminars and conferences where Latin is used as a spoken language, both throughout the year and over the summer, in Europe and in America.

At the present time, several periodicals and social networking web sites are published in Latin. In France, immediately after the conference at Avignon, the publisher  launched the magazine , which still exists, associated to the CERCAM of the Paul Valéry University, Montpellier III. Until very recently, it was published in Latin in its entirety. In Germany, the magazine  was founded in 1965 by Caelestis Eichenseer (1924–2008) and is to this day published wholly in Latin four times a year in the University of Saarbrücken. In Belgium, the magazine Melissa created in 1984 by Gaius Licoppe is still published six times a year completely in Latin.

 is a free online magazine of crosswords, quizzes, and other games in Latin language. It is published by the Italian cultural Association Leonardo in collaboration with the online Latin news magazine  and with ELI publishing house.

From 1989 until 2019, Finnish radio station YLE Radio 1 broadcast a weekly review of world news called  completely in Latin. The German Radio Bremen also had regular broadcasts in Latin until December 2017. Other attempts have been less successful. Beginning from July 2015 Radio F.R.E.I. from Erfurt (Germany) broadcasts in Latin once a week on Wednesdays for 15 minutes; the broadcast is called .

In 2015, the Italian startup pptArt launched its catalogue and its registration form for artists in Latin and English.

In 2016, ACEM (Enel executives' cultural association) organized with Luca Desiata and Daniel Gallagher the first Business Latin course for managers.

The government of Finland, during its presidencies of the European Union, issued official newsletters in Latin on top of the official languages of the Union.

In public spaces

Although less so than in previous eras, contemporary Latin has also been used for public notices in public spaces:

The Wallsend Metro station of the Tyne and Wear Metro has signs in Latin.

The Vatican City has an automated teller machine with instructions in Latin.

Original production

Some contemporary works have been produced originally in Latin, most overwhelmingly poetry, but also prose, as well as music or cinema. They include:

Poetry
1924.  by Tomás Viñas.
1946.  by A. Pinto de Carvalho.
1954.  by Johannes Alexander Gaertner.
1962.  by Henry C. Snurr aka .
1966.  by Jan Novák.
1966.  by Johannes Alexander Gaertner.

Prose
1948.  by Antonio d'Elia.
1952.  by Antonio d'Elia.
1961.  by Jozef IJsewijn.
1966.  by Wolfgang Jenniges.
2011.  (Heptalogia Sphingis) by Stephen A. Berard.
2019: Praecursus: Fabula Neophysiologica (Heptalogia Sphingis) by Stephen A. Berard.
2019. Hebdomada Aenigmatum by Luca Desiata

Music
1927.  by Igor Stravinsky (an opera-oratorio with libretto, based on Sophocles's tragedy, prepared in French by Jean Cocteau and given its final Latin form by Abbé Jean Daniélou).
1994.  by Latin hip hop band Ista.
1995. The works of Elvis Presley have been translated into Latin by Finnish academic Jukka Ammondt.
2008. Super Smash Bros. Brawl Main Theme.
2011.  by French electronic group Justice.
2020. Legend of Zelda, music of Koji Kondo arranged into a symphony by Canadian musician Alexandre Choinière, and texts translated and adapted into Latin by French linguist Olivier Simon

Cinema
1976.  by Derek Jarman and Paul Humfress.
2004. The Passion of the Christ by Mel Gibson.
2009.  by Samohi Latin Media (SLAM).
2010.  by SLAM.
2013.  by Konrad Łęcki.

Television
2008.  by the  team (37:44min special broadcast, 22 August 2008) of the German public channel 3sat.

Blogs
2019-....   is a daily blog in Latin on Linkiesta, where Francesco Lepore, a journalist and a former papal Latinist at the Vatican (2003-2005), comments daily news on politics, crime, health, customs and civil rights.

Translations

Various texts—usually children's books—have been translated into Latin since the beginning of the living Latin movement in the early fifties for various purposes, including use as a teaching tool or simply to demonstrate the capability of Latin as a means of expression in a popular context. They include:
 1884.  (Robinson Crusoe) tr. Francis William Newman.
 1922.  (Treasure Island) tr. Arcadius Avellanus.
 1928.  (Robinson Crusoe) tr. Arcadius Avellanus.
 1960.  (Winnie-the-Pooh) tr. Alexander Lenard.
 1962.  (Ferdinand the Bull) tr. Elizabeth Chamberlayne Hadas.
 1962.  (The Tale of Peter Rabbit) tr. E. Perot Walker.
 1964.  (Alice's Adventures in Wonderland) tr. Clive Harcourt Carruthers.
 1965.  (The Tale of Jemima Puddle-Duck) tr. Jonathan Musgrave.
 1966.  (Through the Looking-Glass, and What Alice Found There) tr. Clive Harcourt Carruthers.
 1973–present. Asterix (Asterix)
 1978.  (The Tale of Mr. Jeremy Fisher) tr. E. Perot Walker.
 1983.  (The Adventures of Alix)
 1985.  (The Little Prince) tr. Augusto Haury
 1987.  (Tintin comic The Black Island)
 1987. The Classical Wizard /  (The Wonderful Wizard of Oz) tr. C.J. Hinke and George Van Buren.
 1990.  (Tintin comic Cigars of the Pharaoh)
 1991.  (Charlotte's Web) tr. Bernice Fox.
 1994.  (Beneath the Wheel) tr. Sigrides C. Albert
 1998.  (How the Grinch Stole Christmas!) tr. Jennifer Morrish Tunberg, Terence O. Tunberg.
 1998.  (The House at Pooh Corner) tr. Brian Staples.
 2000.  (The Cat in the Hat) tr. Jennifer Morish Tunberg, Terence O. Tunberg.
 2002.  (The Giving Tree) tr. Terence O. Tunberg, Jennifer Morrish Tunberg.
 2003.  (Green Eggs and Ham) tr. Terence O. Tunberg, Jennifer Morrish Tunberg.
 2003.  (Harry Potter and the Philosopher's Stone) tr. Peter Needham.
 2005.  ("Three Blind Mice") tr. David C. Noe.
 2006.  (Harry Potter and the Chamber of Secrets) tr. Peter Needham.
 2007. Olivia: the essential Latin edition tr. Amy High.
 2009. Over 265 illustrated children's books in Latin have been published on the Tar Heel Reader website.
 2009.  tr. Claude Aziza and Cathy Rousset.
 2009.  – adaptation of "A Whole New World" from Disney's Aladdin
 2012.  (The Hobbit) tr. Mark Walker.
2022.  (Dr Jekyll and Mr Hyde) tr. Garrett Dome.

Dictionaries, glossaries, and phrase books for contemporary Latin
1990. Latin for All Occasions, a book by Henry Beard, attempts to find Latin equivalents for contemporary catchphrases.
1992–97.  /  by Karl Egger, containing more than 15,000 words for contemporary everyday life.
1998.  by Sigrid Albert.
1999.  by Robert Maier, Mechtild Hofmann, Klaus Sallmann, Sabine Mahr, Sascha Trageser, Dominika Rauscher, Thomas Gölzhäuser.
2010.  by Dorling Kindersley, translated by Robert Maier.
2012.  vol. 1+2 edited by Mechtild Hofmann and Robert Maier (based on ).

See also

 Reginald Foster (Latinist)
 Botanical Latin
 Latin translations of modern literature
 Latino sine Flexione
 Interlingua
 List of songs with Latin lyrics

Notes and references

Further reading

English
 Jozef IJzewijn, A companion to neo-Latin studies, 1977.
 W. H. S. Jones, M.A. Via Nova or The Application of the Direct Method to Latin and Greek, Cambridge University Press 1915.
 Robin Meyer, "Curtain Call for Latin" in The Linguist vol. 59 no. 1 (2020) pp. 22–23

Spanish

French
 , :, s.l., 1989

German
 , 

Latin language
Forms of Latin
Language revival
Latin-language literature
History of literature
Languages attested from the 19th century